St. Peter Port is a town and one of the ten parishes on the island of Guernsey in the Channel Islands. It is the capital of the Bailiwick of Guernsey as well as the main port. The population in 2019 was 18,958.

St. Peter Port is a small town (commonly referred to by locals as just "town") consisting mostly of steep narrow streets and steps on the overlooking slopes. It is known that a trading post/town existed here before Roman times with a pre-Christian name which has not survived.

The parish covers an area of 6.5 km2. The postal code for addresses in the parish starts with GY1.

People from St. Peter Port were nicknamed "les Villais" (the townspeople) or "cllichards" in Guernésiais.

Geography
St. Peter Port is on the east coast of Guernsey overlooking Herm and tiny Jethou, a further channel separates Sark and surrounding islets such as Brecqhou; exceptionally Normandy's long Cotentin Peninsula and, to the south-east, Jersey are visible in clear conditions beyond from some, highest, vantage points. The parish borders St. Sampson in the north, The Vale in the north-west, St. Andrew in the west and St. Martin in the south.

The name of the nearest channel is the Little Russel, in which sits the Bréhon Tower; that separating Sark is the Big Russel.  Both in width are less than half of Guernsey's greatest length and dotted with coastal rocks and stacks quite near those islands, some of which are narrowly submerged.

Relief
The land in the north and by the harbour is low-lying but not marshy. In the south, the land gets higher (but not as high as St Martin's or the Forest). Grassy, gently terraced cliffs behind sea walls (including projections) topped by trees characterise the southern part of the coast here (by an aquarium, underground military museum and historic battery at semi-wooded Havelet). In the north is the retail-centred and more built-up /Admiral Park coastal locality. To the south of the town lies Havelet Bay and the coast path which leads to the very pretty Fermain Bay after a walk of about 20–25 minutes.

Climate
St. Peter Port has an oceanic climate (Cfb) with mild summers and cool winters.

Subdivisions

Saint Peter Port is subdivided into four cantons:
Canton 1 or North Canton
Canton 2 or Canton of the North-West
Canton 3 or Canton of the South-West
Canton 4 or Canton of the South

In addition, the islands of Herm and Jethou belong to the parish, but are not part of any canton. They belong to Electoral district Saint Peter Port South.

Sport and leisure

St. Peter Port has an English Isthmian League club, Guernsey F.C. who play at Footes Lane. The Guernsey Rugby Football Club also play at Footes Lane and compete in National League 3 London & SE.

Parks and gardens

Candie Gardens, an award-winning restored Victorian Garden, features statues of Victor Hugo and Queen Victoria. The Guernsey Museum at Candie and the Priaulx Library are both situated within the grounds of the garden respectively.

Cambridge Park is a recreational park that includes Churchill Avenue, ‘a leafy tree-lined pedestrian Avenue’, named after Winston Churchill and a skate park. In 2014 the parish was a Gold & Category Winner in the RHS Britain in Bloom competition, followed in 2016 with another Gold medal.

Features

The features of the town include:
 St Peter Port Harbour
 Town Church, Guernsey, the parish church of St Peter Port at the heart of the town
 Buildings
 The Royal Court House (La Cohue Royale), seat of the States of Guernsey
 Hauteville House, Victor Hugo's house of exile, which is now a museum under the aegis of the city of Paris).
 National Trust of Guernsey Victorian shop 
 Elizabeth College founded in 1563 by Elizabeth I of England. The main building (built 1826) is a prominent feature of the skyline.
 Victoria Tower
 Priaulx Library
 Guille-Allès Library 
 St James concert hall
 Our Lady of the Rosary Church
 The Market, the Arcade, the High Street, the Pollet, Smith Street, Mill Street and Mansel Street, which are all pedestrian priority and part of the shopping district
 Cobbled streets and narrow passageways of the old town
 Guernsey Museum at Candie (Candie Museum) 
 Candie Gardens 
 Marinas for visiting and local boats
 Military:
 Castle Cornet, the historic fortress that guarded the strategic entrance to the port. The castle was formerly a tidal island, but since 1859 a breakwater has connected it to the enlarged harbour.
 German Naval Signals HQ, HQ of the German Naval Commander Channel Islands which was established next to La Collinette Hotel, and was responsible for all radio traffic to and from Germany and the other Islands. The last operational Signals HQ that was running up until 9 May 1945, using the Enigma code machines that were being decoded by the staff at Bletchley Park. 
 Island war memorial at the top of Smith Street 
 Parish war memorial at the bottom of Smith Street
 St Stephens war memorial in St Stephens church
 Liberation monument
 Anglo-Boer War memorial, in the Avenue 
 Fort George
 Cemetery at Fort George
 Commonwealth War Graves at Le Foulon cemetery
 Clarence Battery dating from the Napoleonic Wars
 La Vallette military museum 
 German fortifications, built during the occupation 1940–45
 Two 13.5 cm K 09 German World War I Canon near Victoria Tower
 The Guernsey Aquarium, situated in fortified tunnels at La Vallette, built during the German occupation. Scheduled to close down permanently next month (October 2019) due to lack of income and funds. As of December 2021, it is now closed. 
 
 Bathing places at La Vallette
 A number of protected buildings 
 Castle Carey was built in 1840 for John Carey. It is a Gothic revival property, attributed to the architect John Wilson, who designed Elizabeth College and St James Concert Hall. It was briefly the residence of the Lieutenant Governor of the Bailiwick of Guernsey and hosted Queen Victoria and Prince Albert during their visit to Guernsey in 1859, and the Duke of Cambridge in 1862. Victor Hugo’s novel Les Travailleurs de la Mer, published in 1866 and dedicated to Guernsey, where he spent 15 years in exile, mentions Castle Carey. The castle stayed in the Carey family until William Wilfred Carey sold it in 1912. During the Second World War, the Germans occupying Guernsey used Castle Carey as an officers’ club.

The parish of Saint Peter Port hosts:
 Government House (office of the Lieutenant Governor of Guernsey
 St Peter Port Douzaine
 Guernsey Information Centre
 Fire Station
 States of Guernsey Police Service
 Guernsey Ambulance and Rescue Service
 Saint Peter Port Lifeboat Station
 Guernsey Border Agency
 Guernsey Post
 Footes Lane
 Ladies' College
 Vauvert Primary School
 Many shops
 Number of banks
 Large number of offices 
 The International Stock Exchange
 Condor Ferries, a car ferry company which operates to Jersey, France and the UK, has its head office in Saint Peter Port.
 Countryside walks 
 Val des Terres Hill Climb
 St Peter Port Harbour Carnival 
 Town Carnival

Main roads
The following main roads (listed from north-south) provide important links between St Peter Port and the other parishes:
 Les Banques (leads up the coast to St Sampson's and the north of the island)
 Rohais (leads to the parish of Castel)
 Mount Row (leads to St Andrew's and the west of the island)
 Ruette Brayes (leads to St Martin's and the south of the island)
 Fort Road (leads to St Martin's)
The following coastal roads (listed from north to south) are also very important as they provide access to the shops, carparks and the harbour:
 St George's Esplanade
 North Esplanade
 South Esplanade
 Mount Durand

Politics
Saint Peter Port comprises two administrative division, St Peter Port South and St Peter Port North.

In the 2016 Guernsey general election in:
 St Peter Port South there was a 2,068  or 63% turnout to elect five Deputies
 St Peter Port North there was a 2,639 or 65% turnout to elect six Deputies.

Notable people

 Margaret Ann Neve – Supercentenarian and the oldest woman in the world until her death in 1903
 Sir Isaac Brock – Major General, "Hero of Upper Canada", War of 1812
 Matt Le Tissier, footballer
 Alison Merrien MBE, World indoors bowls champion
 George Métivier, poet
 Heather Watson, tennis player, Team GB athlete and Wimbledon Champion
 Victor Hugo, French writer, In exile in St-Peter Port from 1855 to 1870.
 Cameron Chalmers, athlete

Numismatic History

Guernsey bank notes feature a number of parish buildings:

 One pound, the Market and the Royal Court
 One pound commemorative, the Market and Fountain Street
 Five pound, the Town Church

 Ten pound, Elizabeth College
 Twenty pound, St James concert hall
 Fifty pound, Royal Court house

See also

 Maritime history of the Channel Islands

References

External links

The St. Peter Port Parish Constables Website
The Town Church Website

 
Peter Port
Saint Peter Port